Liga de Beisbol Profesional Nacional (LBPN) is the professional baseball league of  Nicaragua. The league consists of five teams with a 30 game regular season schedule that runs from November to December. Followed by a four team round robin, with the two best teams advancing to a best of seven championship series.

Inaugurated on March 30, 1956, in Estadio Nacional, the first game was between the teams from San Fernando and Bóer. The Nicaraguan public's excitement for baseball grew as foreign professional teams and foreign players came to play in their country. Due to economic difficulty, the league had to shut down in 1967. The teams from Bóer and León were the most successful teams in those years with three championships each.

The professional league was re-established in 2004. Since then, Bóer has led the league in championships with five.

Current teams

 Indios del Bóer (Managua)
 Tigres del Chinandega
 Gigantes de Rivas
 Leones de León
 Tren del Norte (Esteli)

Defunct:
 Orientales de Granada
 Fieras del San Fernando

Stadiums 
Dennis Martínez National Stadium, Managua
Estadio Efrain Tijerino, Chinandega
Estadio Yamil Rios Ugarte, Rivas
Estadio Héroes y Mártires de Septiembre, León
Estadio de Beisbol Rufo Marín, Estelí
Defunct:
Estadio Roberto Clemente, Masaya
Estadio Roque Tadeo Zavala, Granada

Champions

Winner of the Serie Interamericana 
One time a team from Nicaragua could win the Serie Interamericana.

Winner of the Serie Latinoamericana 
Four times a team from Nicaragua could win the Serie Latinoamericana.

Individual leaders 

Hitting

Pitching

See also
Baseball awards#Nicaragua

External links
Liga de Beisbol Profesional Nacional official website

 
Baseball competitions in Nicaragua
Baseball leagues in North America
Latin American baseball leagues
 
Winter baseball leagues